Taleem-o-Tarbiat (in English: Education and Training) is a children's Urdu-language magazine published by Zaheer Salam of Ferozsons in Lahore, Punjab, Pakistan.

History and profile
Taleem-o-Tarbiat was established in April 1941. The publisher, Ferozsons, claims it is "Pakistan's oldest" children's magazine. A 1961 edition of The Pakistan Review said "Among Urdu writers Saeed Lakht, Editor of Taleem-o-Tarbiat, is the most popular with the children." Ayasha Syeed, writing in Living Our Religions, said "I still have fond memories of Taleem-o-Tarbiat, my favorite childhood Urdu language magazine, that we received on a subscription basis. This periodical was full of stories and anecdotes that carried Sufi wisdom, adapted for children."

Common topics in magazine include: praises, Na`at, Islamic education, poetry, jokes, painting gallery, golden words, and Pakistan's history, play of 10mins, riddles. 

Famous Novels Published

The famous novels published in TOT include Purisrar Naqab Posh ( A Hameed) Angothi kahan gai ( A Hameed), Mission Siachin (Saleem Khan Gummi), Churailon Kay Sarayee, Sabz Paniyon key Shehr, Raz aik ropye ka, Dhoop chaon, Gharhay me Lash, Robinson Crusoe, ghaibi insaan ( The Hollow Man) ak mandik ak ullu ( A Toad for Tuesday ) Cheekhta Khanjar, Shahnama Furdosi, Jamwaron Ki Kahani, Mehmood pr kia Beeti, Khooni Jazera (Treasure Island), Pinako k Karnamay (Pinocchio), Mera Nam Mungo hai, Barfani Insan (Saleem khan Gimmi), Raju ki kahani, etc.

Noted writers

Noted writers for the magazine have included Syed Dilawar Ali Meerza Adeeb.
Syad Lakht,
Saleem Khan Gumi,
Bakht Rasa, Younas Hasrat etc.

See also 
 List of Urdu magazines for children
 List of magazines in Pakistan

References

External links
 

Magazines established in 1961
Mass media in Lahore
Monthly magazines published in Pakistan
Children's magazines published in Pakistan
Urdu-language magazines
1961 establishments in Pakistan
Ferozsons books